A. W. Baskcomb (1879 – 1939) was a British stage actor known for his comedy roles. He also appeared in several films. On stage he originated the role of Slightly in J.M. Barrie's 1904 play Peter and Wendy, continuing to play it for the next seven years. Other appearances included the Edwardian musical The Gay Gordons and Frederick Lonsdale's The Street Singer.

His daughter was the actress Betty Baskcomb. Three photographic portraits of Baskcomb are in the collection of the National Portrait Gallery, London.

Filmography
 The Staff Dinner (1913, short)
 A Safe Proposition (1932)
 The Lodger (1932)
 The Midshipmaid (1932)
 The Good Companions (1933)

References

Bibliography
 Bruce K. Hanson. Peter Pan on Stage and Screen, 1904-2010. McFarland, 2011.

External links

1879 births
1939 deaths
British male film actors
British male stage actors
People from Pimlico